The Michigan AuSable Valley Railroad is a , 1/4-scale ridable miniature railway, located in Fairview, Michigan. The railroad runs through the scenic Huron National Forest and the Comins Creek valley.  The railroad has remained in operation since 1994.

History
 
This Minimum-gauge railway  truly a big backyard railroad was created by Joanne and Howard Schrader.  They began construction of the Michigan AuSable Valley Railroad station and the  engine house in 1994. In 1995, seven passenger cars from the Pinconning and Blind River Railroad were restored for use on the line. The cars are named after area counties and other points of interest in the Huron National Forest. From 15 April to 2 December 1996, the Michigan AuSable Valley Railroad constructed two wooden trestles and a  wooden tunnel. The longest trestle spans over UNTIL IT COLLAPSED .  The railroad meanders through jack pine country near the valleys of the Au Sable River.

The Schraders are publishers, distributors and operators of a railroad catalog.

Trainorders.com reported in 2017 that the Schraders were retiring from operating the railroad and the catalog. The facility, owners' residence and acreage was listed for sale in 2017, together with the affiliated railroad catalog store. The railroad and property was sold. As of April 30, 2021, the new owner has been unable to sustain the operation and sold the rails and rolling stock to be reassembled at an undisclosed location.

Locomotives

The Custom Locomotive Works in Chicago constructed a pair of miniature F-7 A diesel locomotive units for the Michigan AuSable Valley Railroad over a period of nine months. The front locomotive contains the engine while the slug unit balances the weight. The powered unit has an 80 hp Perkins diesel engine driving 16 wheels and supplying power to an air-brake system.

Locomotive No. 5661 is a 4-6-4 oil-fired steam engine, known as the "Hudson", built in 1961 by E.C. Eddy of Fairview. The locomotive originally ran on the Pinconning and Blind River Railroad. It now runs on the AuSable on selected Sundays and holidays.  The Hudson steam locomotive was restored circa 2002.

The trackage was laid by family and friends.  It is serpentine, sometimes with parallel and crossing tracks, making a surprising  trip, approximately 18 minutes long.  The railroad uses over 5,500 railroad ties.  In 1995 four switches were added to the route.

Schedule

The Summer Schedule in 2015 was Memorial Day weekend through Labor Day weekend. The Fall Color tour for 2015 ran on two weekends in October.  The scheduled days were extremely limited at about 38 days per year.  2017 was said to be the railroad's final year of operation.

It is in the environs of the North Central State Trail.

References

Notes

Citations

External links

Photos, at Michigan Railroad Photo Collection hobbyist site
Schraders' Railroad Catalog
Photo gallery at Weichert Realty

1994 establishments in Michigan
Amusement rides based on rail transport
Backyard railways
Backyard railroads in the United States
Heritage railroads in Michigan
Miniature railways
Miniature railroads in the United States
Minimum gauge railways
Rail transport hobbies
Tourist attractions in Oscoda County, Michigan
Transportation in Oscoda County, Michigan